DNA polymerase may refer to:

 DNA polymerase, enzymes that create DNA molecules by assembling nucleotides
 DNA polymerase I, an enzyme that participates in the process of DNA replication
 DNA polymerase II, a prokaryotic DNA-Dependent DNA polymerase encoded by the PolB gene
 DNA polymerase III holoenzyme, the primary enzyme complex involved in prokaryotic DNA replication
 DNA polymerase IV, a prokaryotic polymerase that is involved in mutagenesis
 DNA polymerase V, a polymerase enzyme involved in DNA repair mechanisms in the bacteria Escherichia coli
 DNA polymerase alpha, an enzyme complex found in eukaryotes that is involved in initiation of DNA replication
 DNA polymerase alpha catalytic subunit, an enzyme that in humans is encoded by the POLA1 gene
 DNA polymerase alpha subunit 2, an enzyme that in humans is encoded by the POLA2 gene
 DNA polymerase delta, an enzyme complex found in eukaryotes that is involved in DNA replication and repair
 POLD4, DNA polymerase delta subunit 4
 DNA polymerase epsilon, a member of the DNA polymerase family of enzymes
 Hepatitis B virus DNA polymerase, a hepatitis B viral protein